Viktor Thorn was a Norwegian nordic combined athlete who won the Nordic combined event at the Holmenkollen ski festival in 1895. For that honor, Thorn became the first winner of the Holmenkollen medal that same year.

References
Holmenkollen medalists - click Holmenkollmedaljen for downloadable pdf file 
Holmenkollen winners since 1892 - click Vinnere for downloadable pdf file 

Holmenkollen medalists
Holmenkollen Ski Festival winners
Norwegian male Nordic combined skiers
Year of birth missing
Year of death missing